Eucosma campoliliana is a moth of the family Tortricidae. It is found in Europe, China (Jilin, Heilongjiang), Japan and Russia.

The wingspan is 13–18 mm. The head is adorned with white hairs, while the thorax is black with white spots on the sides. The ground colour of the forewings is snow white, with an interrupted, light brown cross-band in the middle and the wing tip mostly brown. There are areas with small black spots at the base and in the outer part of the wing. The hindwings are light grey-brown. 

The moth flies from June to August in western Europe.

The larvae feed on Jacobaea vulgaris and Tephroseris species.

References

External links
 Lepidoptera of Belgium
 Eucosma campoliliana at UK Moths
 waarneming.nl 

Eucosmini
Moths described in 1775
Moths of Asia
Tortricidae of Europe
Moths of Japan